Thorhild is a hamlet in Alberta, Canada within Thorhild County.

Thorhild was formerly a village until April 1, 2009, when it dissolved and became a hamlet within the County of Thorhild No. 7. It originally incorporated as a village on December 31, 1949.  The Alberta and Great Waterways Railway paid $480 for the original townsite on July 16, 1914.

Demographics 

See also 
List of communities in Alberta
List of former urban municipalities in Alberta
List of hamlets in Alberta

References 

Designated places in Alberta
Former villages in Alberta
Hamlets in Alberta
Populated places disestablished in 2009
Thorhild County